The Gothic Wars were a long series of conflicts between the Goths and the Roman Empire between the years 249 and 554. The main wars are detailed below.

Gothic War (249–253)

(Goths under Cniva against the Roman Empire)

The War was probably instigated after emperor Decius' predecessor Philip the Arab had refused to continue payments of annual subsidies to the tribes of the region initiated by Emperor Maximinus Thrax in 238 while they were starving.

The Goths were led by King Cniva who had crossed the Danube in 249 or 250 with two armies. 

Cniva's main column of 70,000 unsuccessfully attacked Novae and were then defeated by Decius at the Battle of Nicopolis ad Istrum before moving on to Augusta Traiana pursued by Decius where at the Battle of Beroe they defeated him and looted the city. Decius was forced to withdraw his army north to Oescus leaving Cniva ample time to ravage Moesia and move on to Philippopolis (Thracia) (now Plovdiv in Bulgaria). 

Another army of about 20,000 besieged Marcianopolis without success. Then they also headed south to besiege Philippopolis. 

The Battle of Philippopolis was fought in 250 or 251 and after a long siege of the city the Goths were victorious. 

King Cniva subsequently allied himself with the town commander and governor of Thrace, Titus Julius Priscus, to take on the Roman Emperor Decius.

The Battle of Abritus of 251 resulted at which Decius and his son Herennius Etruscus were killed.

Gothic War (267–269)

(Goths and Scythians against the Roman Empire)

During the "Crisis of the third century" when the Empire almost collapsed, the greatest Gothic invasion so far occurred in 268. The Goths' seaborne allies, the Heruli, supplied a fleet carrying huge armies along the coast of the Black Sea where they ravaged coastal territories in Thrace and Macedonia. Other huge forces crossed the Danube in Moesia. An invasion of Goths into the province of Pannonia was also threatening disaster. 

In 268, Emperor Gallienus won some important initial victories at land and sea, but it was his successor Claudius II who finally defeated the invaders at the Battle of Naissus in 268 or 269, one of the bloodiest battles of the 3rd century. The invaders incurred thirty to fifty thousand dead.

Gothic War (367–369)
(Thervingi against the Eastern Roman Empire)

The Gothic king Ermanaric of a powerful kingdom north of the Danube from the Euxine to the Baltic Sea, had engaged to supply the usurper Procopius with troops for the struggle against Valens. The Gothic army, reportedly numbering 30,000 men, arrived too late to help Procopius, but nevertheless invaded Thrace and began plundering the farms and vineyards of the province. Valens, marching north after defeating Procopius, surrounded them with a superior force and forced them to surrender.

In the spring of 367, Valens crossed the Danube and attacked the Visigoths under Athanaric. The Goths fled into the Carpathian Mountains, and the campaign ended with no decisive conclusion. The following spring, a Danube flood prevented Valens from crossing; instead he had his troops construct fortifications. In 369, Valens crossed again, from Noviodunum, and by devastating the country forced Athanaric to attack him. Valens was victorious, and Athanaric received Ermanaric's permission to conclude a truce. Athanaric pleaded for treaty terms and Valens gladly obliged. The treaty seems to have largely cut off relations between Goths and Romans, confining trade and the exchange of troops for tribute.

Gothic War (376–382)

(Greuthungi and Thervingi against the Eastern Roman Empire)

Between about 376 and 382 the Gothic War against the Eastern Roman Empire, and in particular the Battle of Adrianople, is commonly seen as important in the history of the Roman Empire, the first of a series of events over the next century that would see the collapse of the Western Roman Empire, although its ultimate importance to the Empire's eventual fall is still debated.

Gothic War (401–403)

(Visigoths against the Western Roman Empire)

In 401 Alaric invaded Italy, but he was defeated by Stilicho at Pollentia (modern Pollenza) on April6, 402. A second invasion that same year also ended in defeat at the Battle of Verona, though Alaric forced the Roman Senate to pay a large subsidy to the Visigoths, and devastated Greece.

Later, Alaric led the Sack of Rome (410).

Gothic War (458)
(Visigoths under Theodoric II against the Western Roman Empire under Majorian)

In late 458 Majorian entered Septimania (now southern France) to attack Theodoric and reclaim the province for the empire. Majorian defeated Theodoric at the Battle of Arelate, forcing him to abandon Septimania and withdraw west to Aquitania. Under the new treaty with the Romans, the Visigoths had to relinquish their recent conquests in Hispania and return to federate status.

Gothic War (461–476)
(Visigoths under Theodoric II, then Euric, against the Western Roman Empire)

Gothic War (535–554)

(Ostrogoths against the Eastern Roman Empire under Justinian I)

The Gothic War between the Byzantine Empire (Eastern Roman) during the reign of Emperor Justinian I and the Ostrogothic Kingdom of Italy took place from 535 until 554 in the Italian peninsula, Dalmatia, Sardinia, Sicily and Corsica. 

Historians commonly divide the war into two phases
 From 535 to 540: ending with the fall of the Ostrogothic capital Ravenna and the apparent reconquest of Italy by the Byzantines.
 From 540/541 to 553: a Gothic revival under Totila, suppressed only after a long struggle by the Byzantine general Narses, who also repelled an invasion in 554 by the Franks and Alamanni. 

In 554 Justinian promulgated the Pragmatic sanction which prescribed Italy's new government. Later, the Byzantines found themselves incapable of resisting an invasion by the Lombards in 568, which resulted in Constantinople permanently losing control over large parts of the Italian peninsula.

References

Wars involving the Goths